James Daniel "BJ" Bjorken (born 1934) is an American theoretical physicist.  He was a Putnam Fellow in 1954, received a BS in physics from MIT in 1956, and obtained his PhD from Stanford University in 1959.  He was a visiting scholar at the Institute for Advanced Study in the fall of 1962.  Bjorken is Emeritus Professor in the SLAC Theory Group at the Stanford Linear Accelerator Center, and was a member of the Theory Department of the Fermi National Accelerator Laboratory (1979–1989).

He was awarded the Dirac Medal of the ICTP in 2004;  and, in 2015, the Wolf Prize in Physics  and the EPS High Energy and Particle Physics Prize.

Early life and education
James Bjorken's father, J. Daniel Bjorken, was an immigrant from Sweden near Lake Siljan. He changed his surname from "Björkén" to Bjorken upon arriving in the US; he moved to Chicago to work as an electrical engineer, which is where he met his future wife, Edith. James Bjorken grew up in Chicago and enjoyed mathematics, chemistry, the French horn, and watching the Chicago Cubs play at Wrigley Field. After graduating from Maine East High School in 1952, he decided to attend Massachusetts Institute of Technology (MIT) over the University of Chicago. Despite being offered more financial aid to attend the University of Chicago, his parents advised him that he should move further away to find his independence.

At MIT, he quickly decided to major in physics; one of the main reasons was his enjoyment of the lectures that Hans Mueller gave. Another of his influences at MIT was Sidney Drell, who became his mentor. After graduating in 1956, he attended Stanford University, graduating with his PhD in 1959 and staying on as a postdoctoral researcher for several years.

Work
Bjorken discovered in 1968 what is known as light-cone scaling (or Bjorken scaling), a phenomenon in the deep inelastic scattering of light on strongly interacting particles, known as hadrons (such as protons and neutrons):
Experimentally observed hadrons behave as collections of virtually independent point-like constituents when probed at high energies.

Properties of these hadrons scale, that is, they are determined not by the absolute energy of an experiment, but, instead,  by dimensionless kinematic quantities, such as a scattering angle or the ratio of the energy to a momentum transfer. Because increasing energy implies potentially improved spatial resolution, scaling implies independence of the absolute resolution scale, and hence effectively point-like substructure.

This observation was critical to the recognition of quarks as actual elementary particles (rather than just convenient theoretical constructs), and led to the theory of strong interactions known as quantum chromodynamics, where it was understood in terms of the asymptotic freedom property.   In Bjorken's picture, the quarks become point-like, observable objects at very short distances (high energies), shorter than the size of the hadrons.

Bjorken also discovered the Bjorken sum rule, the prototypical QCD spin sum rule. It states that in the Bjorken scaling domain, the integral of the spin structure function of the proton minus that of the neutron is proportional to the axial charge of the nucleon. The sum rule was experimentally verified within better than a 10% precision.

Bjorken was also among the first to point out to the phenomena of jet quenching in heavy ion collisions in 1982.

Richard Feynman subsequently reformulated this concept into the parton model, used to understand the quark composition of hadrons at high energies. The predictions of Bjorken scaling were confirmed in the early late 1960s electroproduction experiments at SLAC, in which quarks were seen for the first time.  The general idea, with small logarithmic modifications, is explained in quantum chromodynamics by "asymptotic freedom".

Bjorken co-authored, with Sidney Drell, a classic companion volume textbook on relativistic quantum mechanics and quantum fields.

Publications

Books

Selected papers
J. D. Bjorken (1968). "Current Algebra at Small Distances", in Proceedings of the International School of Physics Enrico Fermi Course XLI, J. Steinberger, ed., Academic Press, New York, pp. 55–81.     Online, SLAC-PUB-338

Full list of papers
       INSPIRE-HEP -- Bjorken

Notes

References
Oral history interview transcript with James Bjorken on 1 April 2020, American Institute of Physics, Niels Bohr Library and Archives
SLAC Bio
 APS bio
 Wu-Ki Tung, "Bjorken Scaling" in Scholarpedia (2009).
Wolf prize

External links

Members of the United States National Academy of Sciences
1934 births
Living people
21st-century American physicists
Putnam Fellows
Institute for Advanced Study visiting scholars
Theoretical physicists
Foreign Members of the Russian Academy of Sciences
MIT Department of Physics alumni
Stanford University alumni
Fellows of the American Physical Society
Wolf Prize in Physics laureates
American people of Swedish descent
Members of the Royal Swedish Academy of Sciences